Harry Rupert "Big Jeff" Jefferson (May 12, 1899 – April 24, 1966) was an American football, basketball, and baseball coach and college athletics administrator.  He served as the head football coach at Wilberforce University (1923), Bluefield State College (1925–1929, 1932–1933), North Carolina Agricultural and Technical State University (1930–1931), Virginia State University (1934–1948), Hampton University (1949–1959), compiling a career college football coaching record of 173–92–25. Jefferson led his teams to black college football national championships in 1927, 1928, and 1936. Jefferson was the first chairman and charter member of the National Athletic Steering Committee (NASC) in 1951. Later, Jefferson served as president of the NASC in 1957 and was honorary president in 1959. Jefferson was also honored by the NASC in 1958 for 35 years "contributed to the development of youth through athletic coaching and administration." Jefferson was also the first commissioner of the Central Intercollegiate Athletic Association (CIAA) in 1961. In college, he was a founding member of the  Phi chapter of Alpha Phi Alpha at Ohio University. Jefferson died of a heart attack, on April 24, 1966, at Mercy Douglas Hospital in Philadelphia. His funeral was held at Arlington National Cemetery.

Head coaching record

References

1899 births
1966 deaths
American football centers
American football guards
Bluefield State Big Blues athletic directors
Bluefield State Big Blues football coaches
Central Intercollegiate Athletic Association commissioners
Hampton Pirates and Lady Pirates athletic directors
Hampton Pirates football coaches
North Carolina A&T Aggies athletic directors
North Carolina A&T Aggies football coaches
Ohio Bobcats football players
Virginia State Trojans football coaches
Virginia State Trojans men's basketball coaches
West Virginia State Yellow Jackets football players
Wilberforce Bulldogs baseball coaches
Wilberforce Bulldogs football coaches
High school basketball coaches in West Virginia
High school football coaches in West Virginia
African-American coaches of American football
African-American players of American football
African-American college athletic directors in the United States
20th-century African-American sportspeople